Kevin Rüegg (born 5 August 1998) is a Swiss professional footballer who plays as a right-back for Young Boys on loan from the Italian club Hellas Verona. He can also play in midfield. He has represented Switzerland at various youth levels.

Career
In August 2020, Rüegg moved to Serie A side Hellas Verona on a five-year contract.

In February 2022, Rüegg was loaned to Lugano until the end of the season.

On 16 July 2022, Rüegg joined Young Boys on loan with an option to buy.

Personal life
Born in Switzerland, Rüegg's mother is Cameroonian and his father is Swiss.

Honours
Lugano
Swiss Cup: 2021–22

Career statistics

Club

References

External links
 
 FC Zürich Stats

1998 births
Living people
People from Uster
Association football midfielders
Swiss men's footballers
Switzerland youth international footballers
Switzerland under-21 international footballers
Swiss people of Cameroonian descent
Swiss sportspeople of African descent
Swiss Super League players
Serie A players
FC Zürich players
Hellas Verona F.C. players
FC Lugano players
BSC Young Boys players
Swiss expatriate footballers
Expatriate footballers in Italy
Swiss expatriate sportspeople in Italy
Sportspeople from the canton of Zürich